Permyak language (previously Komi-Permyak language;   or  ) is one of two Permic varieties in the Uralic language family that form a pluricentric language, the other being Komi-Zyryan (Udmurt is another Permic language spoken outside of the region and not a member of the Komi pluricentric language).

The Komi-Permyak language, spoken in Perm Krai of Russia and written using the Komi Cyrillic alphabet, was co-official with Russian in the Komi Okrug of the Perm Krai.

Glottonym

The original name of the Komi-Permyak language is коми кыв "Komi language", identical with the native name of the Komi-Zyryan language.

In the 1920s, the Soviet authorities introduced the new name for the Komi language in the Perm Region as коми-пермяцкий язык, the Komi-Permian language, combining the native name of the language with the Russian one. The new name was transliterated in Komi as коми-пермяцкöй кыв 'Komi-Permyak language'. In this way, the local language was nominally separated from the Komi-Zyryan language, that officially received the original name, the Komi language. The Komis of the Perm Region had to officially use the new name, even though it has negative connotations for the speakers, continuing to use the original name, the Komi language, exclusively in their colloquial speech.

Only in the early years of the first decade of the 2000s has there begun a controversial process of replacing the offensive official name with a more correct one. The term перем коми кыв 'Permian Komi language' was proposed and it is used nowadays (alongside the old term) in local mass-media, in scientific papers and in the Komi-Permyak version of Wikipedia.

Dialects

All of the Komi-Permyak dialects are easily mutually intelligible and, to a lesser extent, mutually intelligible with the Komi-Zyryan dialects.

The Komi-Permyak dialects might be divided geographically into Northern and Southern groups, and phonemically into /l/ and /v/ groups:

 Northern
/l/ type: лым /lɨm/ "snow", вӧл /vɘl/ "a horse", вӧлтӧг /vɘltɘg/ "without a horse", вӧлӧн /vɘlɘn/ "with a horse, on a horse"
Upper Lupya
Mysy (former rural council)
Kosa-Kama
Kochevo
Zyuzdino (Afanasyevo)
Yazva
 Southern
/v/ type: вым /vɨm/, вӧв /vɘv/, вӧвтӧг /vɘvtɘg/, вӧвӧн /vɘvɘn/
Kudymkar-Inva
Lower Inva
Southern /l/ type: лым /lɨm/, вӧл /vɘl/, вӧлтӧг /vɘltɘg/, вӧлӧн /vɘlɘn/
On
Nerdva

Formerly a southern dialect group existed in the Obva river basin, but it is now extinct except for the Nerdva dialect. Because of this the latter is nowadays usually considered together with the central group, which in this way has become "southern".

The central (new southern) and northern groups of Komi-Permyak are spoken in Komi Okrug of Perm Krai, where the language was standardized in the 1920s. The modern standard is based on Kudymkar dialect of the central group, but many elements of northern dialects were included as well, so that the "literary language" has significant differences in its morphological system from the "main" dialect.

The central dialects, spoken in the Ińva river basin, differ considerably from the other Komi-Permyak dialects due to the general shift of etymological /l/ to /v/, then to /w/, and finally to the disappearance of the  consonant, which has triggered significant changes in morphology.

The differences between the Kudymkar and Uliś Ińva dialects are mainly in accentuation: the Uliś Ińva has a phonological stress (the Öń too), whereas the Kudymkar dialect (like as Ńerdva) has a morphological one. The Ńerdva dialect retains the etymological /l/. The same can be said about the Öń dialect (recently extinct), that had connections with the eastern Permian.

The northern group of the Permian dialects (upon Kösva, Kama and Lup rivers) was under a strong Zyryan influence on all levels. The Köć and Kös dialects are closely related with some Syktyv dialects of Zyryan, whereas the Lup dialect was in tenuous connections with the Upper Ezhva dialect for a long time.

The Komi-Permyak standard language refers only to the central and northern groups of the Komi-Permyak dialects. They can be called as proper Permian dialects. The other two groups are marginal.

An only relic of the eastern Permian is the Yaźva dialect, ca. 200 speakers of the ca. 900 ethnical Komis in Krasnovishersky District of Perm Krai. In the early 2000s (decade) it was standardized by authority of the krai. The dialect has archaic system of vowels (including /ö/, /ü/ and /ʌ/), while its accentuation is similar to Uliś Ińva's and its lexical system is like the Northern Permian one.

The Western Permian group is represented by another marginal dialect, Źuźdin (ca. 1000 persons living in Kirov Oblast near the border of Komi Okrug).

Phonology
In the Komi-Permyak standard language there are the same 26 main consonants and 7 vowels as in Komi-Zyryan.

Consonants
Komi-Permyak's modern consonant system includes 26 native ones, and the additional consonants /ts/, /f/, /x/ in Russian loanwords. In traditional speech the "foreign sounds" were replaced with respectively /t͡ɕ/, /p/, and /k/, respectively.

Only in Russian loanwords.

Vowels

The Komi-Permyak vowel system can be considered as being three-dimensional, where vowels are characterised by three features: front and back, rounded and unrounded and vowel height.

Komi-Permyak does not distinguish between long and short vowels and does not have vowel harmony. There are no diphthongs; when two vowels come together, which occurs at some morpheme boundaries, each vowel retains its individual sound.

Writing system
Both regional standards of the Komi language have an identical alphabet, introduced in 1938. The alphabet (anbur, анбур) includes all the Russian letters plus two additional graphemes: і and ӧ.

Grammar
Komi is an agglutinating language. It uses affixes to express possession, to specify mode, time, and so on.

Nouns
All Permian Komi nouns are declined for number, case and possession, adding special suffixes to word stems.

Number

In Permian Komi there are two grammatical numbers: singular and plural. The singular is the unmarked form of a word, and the plural is obtained by inflecting the singular.

The plural marker of nouns is /ez/ (orthographically эз or ез) immediately following a word stem before any case or other affixes. The last consonant of the stem before the plural suffix has to be duplicated.

The plural suffix has also a reduced variant (a "weak form") /е/ (orth. э or е), that is used combining with some weak forms of possessive suffixes, e.g. киэт 'your (Sg.) hands ' versa  киэз 'hands'.

Possession

The Permian Komi possessive suffixes are added to the end of nouns either before or after a case suffix depending on case. The three suffixes of singular possession have in addition to their main forms  the weak variants used combining with a weak form of plural suffix,  weak forms of some cases or forming the suffixes of plural possession.

 The weak variants of the suffix
 The element ны is a marker of plural possession

The possessive suffix of 3Sg is widely used also as a definite article. In colloquial speech it is the main meaning of this suffix.

Cases

It is assumed, that the Permian Komi standard language has eighteen noun cases: ten grammatical cases and eight locative cases. The disputes continue about the status of some monosyllabic postpositions and a set of dialectal reduced forms of postpositions that can be treated as case suffixes too. The maximal number of all possible cases reaches 30.

The case suffixes are added to the end of nouns either before or after a possessive suffix depending on case. Some cases have weak variants of their suffixes combining with the weak variants of possessive suffixes.

Adjectives
Used attributively, Permian Komi adjectives precede the nouns they modify, and are not declined: басöк нывка 'beautiful girl' → басöк нывкаэслö 'to the beautiful girls'.

However most adjectives can also be used as nouns and sometimes as appositions, in which case they are declined: e.g. ыджыт ("big") → ыджыттэзісь ("out of the bigs"). The declensional paradigma is the same as by nouns, except the main accusative form, that became by adjectives suffix ö instead of öс or a null morpheme by nouns: адззи басöк нывкаöс 'I have found a beautiful girl' → адззи басöкö 'I have found a beautiful [girl]'.

Being predicative an adjective agrees with the subject for number. The plural marker of the predicative is öсь: керкуыс ыджыт 'the house is big ' → керкуэc ыджытöсь 'the houses are big'.

The adjective in Permian Komi have five degrees of comparison

The comparative and the superlative compare the intensity of an object's quality with the other object's one. The sative, excessive and diminutive compare the intensity of the quality with its basic degree.

Numerals
The numerals in Komi-Permyak

Personal pronouns
Komi personal pronouns inflect in all the cases. The language makes no distinction between he, she and it. The nominative case of personal pronouns are listed in the following table:

Verbs

Permian Komi verbs show tense (present, future, past), mood (indicative, imperative, evidential, optative, conditional and conjunctive), voice and aspect.

The verbal stem is a 2nd person singular of imperative mode: мун 'go', кер 'make'. All the other forms are formed by adding suffixes to the stem.

Some verbal stems having a consonant cluster at the end become expanded with a so-called "voyelle de soutien"  which is dropped before the suffixes beginning with a vowel:  =  'hear',  'swear' = , e. g.  'to hear',  'by hearing' but  'I heard',  'he hears',  'you hear'. Thus, these stems with a consonant cluster have their full und reduced variants.

Permian infinitives are marked with  added to a stem as in  'to go',   'hear'

All Permian Komi verbs are conjugated in the same way, except for the defective verb  'to be'.

Negation is mostly expressed by a conjugated negator preceding the stem, e. g.  'I didn't go'.

The indicative mood has three tenses: present, future and past. The main marker of the present and future tense is а (negat. о), the marker of the past tense is и (negat. э).

Here is conjugation of verb керны 'make, do':

Notes.
 Present and future forms differ just in affirm. 3rd  person (ö / öны to ас / асö).
 Future and past forms differ only with tense marker (the future -а / о- to the past -и / э-).
 In present affirmative forms the marker of 3rd  person is -ö, which at the same time indicates the tense.

Some phrases

Bibliography

Аксёнова, О. П. (2009). Коми-пермяцкие географические термины и их функционирование в топонимии Верхнего Прикамья. Кудымкар: ПНЦ УрО РАН. 
Баталова, Р. М. (1982). Ареальные исследования по восточным финно-угорским языкам (коми языки). Москва: Изд-во «Наука».
Баталова, Р. М. (1975). Коми-пермяцкая диалектология. Москва: Изд-во «Наука».
Баталова, Р. М., Кривощекова-Гантман А. С. (1985). Коми-пермяцко-русский словарь. – М.: Русский язык.
Кривощекова-Гантман, А. С. (2006). Собрание сочинений в 2 томах. Пермь: Перм. гос. пед. ун-т. ; .
Лобанова, А. С., Шляхова, С. С. (2010). Коми-пермяцкий язык конца ХХ – начала ХХІ веков: стилистические аспекты. Пермь: Перм. гос. пед. ун-т. 
Лыткин В. И. и др. (1962). Коми-пермяцкий язык: Введение, фонетика, лексика и морфология / под ред. и при соавт. проф. В. И. Лыткина. Кудымкар: Коми-перм. кн. изд-во.
Пономарева, Л. Г. (2002). Фонетика и морфология мысовско-лупьинского диалекта коми-пермяцкого языка: дис. ... канд. филол. наук. Ижевск.
Попова, О. А.  (2010). Коми-пермяцкий фразеологический словарь. Пермь: Перм. гос. пед. ун-т. 
Тудвасева З.К. и др. (2008). Русско-коми-пермяцкий разговорник. Кудымкар: Коми-Перм. кн. изд-во. 
Цыпанов, Е. А. (1999). Перым-коми гижӧд кыв. Сыктывкар: «Пролог» небöг лэдзанін.

Further reading
 Fedosejeva, Jelena. "Замечания по лексикологии коми-пермяцкого языка (с этимологиями)" [Some Lexicological Remarks on the Komi-Permyak Language]. In: Linguistica Uralica 53, nr. 3, 2017. pp. 179-185. DOI: https://dx.doi.org/10.3176/lu.2017.3.02
 Kochetov, Alexei, and Alevtina Lobanova. “Komi-Permyak Coronal Obstruents: Acoustic Contrasts and Positional Variation”. In: Journal of the International Phonetic Association 37, no. 1 (2007): 51–82. http://www.jstor.org/stable/44526448.

References

External links

 Books in Komi-Permyak from Finno-Ugric Electronic Library (by the Finno-Ugric Information Center in Syktyvkar, Komi Republic (interface in Russian and English, texts in Mari, Komi, Udmurt, Erzya and Moksha languages))
 Баталова Р. М. Коми-пермяцкий язык.
 Кривощёкова-Гантман А.С. Коми-пермяцко-русский словарь.  (Krivoshchokova-Gantman A.S. Komi-Permyak-Russian Dictionary)

Komi language
Permic languages
Languages of Russia
Agglutinative languages